Democratic and Republican Renewal (abbreviated RDR-Tchanji) is a political party in Niger.

History 
The party was founded on 16 April 2020 by former President Mahamane Ousmane.

Electoral performance 

 2020–21 Nigerien general election, second place in the presidential race, 7 seats in the National Assembly.

External links 

 Official website

References 

Political parties in Niger
2020 establishments in Niger
Political parties established in 2020